Scenella tenuistriata is an extinct species generally classified as a mollusc or hydrozoan in the family Scenellidae.

Description 
Scenella tenuistriata was originally discovered and described by Australian palaeontologist Frederick Chapman in 1911.

Chapman's original text (the type description) reads as follows:

References 
This article incorporates public domain text originating from Australia from the reference.

External links

Scenellidae